Wistlandpound Reservoir is a reservoir in Devon, England owned by South West Water.

Completed in 1957, the earth embankment reservoir holds up to 1,550 megalitres (341 million gallons) and covers an area of 40 acres (16ha).
Situated close to Exmoor National Park, and managed jointly by Forestry England and The South West Lakes Trust, Wistlandpound is a popular recreation area, with bird watching, trout fishing, as well as boating and nature walking among the most popular activities.

The Calvert Trust has a centre at the Reservoir, providing holiday and activity facilities for those with disabilities, and their families.

The construction of the reservoir flooded part of the formation of the Lynton and Barnstaple Railway, which can still be seen when water levels are low. The railway, which is being reconstructed, will follow an alternative route around the side of the reservoir.

The reservoir is used as a water supply, it supplies water to the (former) Ilfracombe urban district (ilfracombe, berrynaurbour, Combe Martin, etc) since the disuse of the Slade reservoirs this task has fallen to wistlandpound reservoir, for a short time they would have co-existed as a water supply.

External links 
 Discover Wistlandpound
 SouthWest Water
 The Calvert Trust
 Wistlandpound Forestry England webpage

Nature reserves in Devon
Drinking water reservoirs in England
Lynton and Barnstaple Railway
Reservoirs in Devon
1957 establishments in England